Sir John Filmer, 4th Baronet (1716–1797), of East Sutton, Kent was a Member of Parliament for Steyning in 1767–1774.

Arms

References

1716 births
1797 deaths
Members of the Parliament of Great Britain for English constituencies
British MPs 1761–1768
British MPs 1768–1774
Baronets in the Baronetage of England
People from the Borough of Maidstone